Ninian may refer to:

People
 Ninian, medieval Christian bishop who evangelized the Picts
 Ninian Cockburn (died 1579), Scottish soldier
 Ninian Edwards (1775–1833), American politician
 Ninian Wirt Edwards (1809–1889), American politician
 Ninian Stephen (1923–2017), Australian Governor-General
 Ninian Crichton Stuart (born 1957), Scottish hereditary palace keeper
 Lord Ninian Crichton-Stuart (1883–1915), Welsh politician

Places
 Ninian (river), France
 Ninian Central Platform, oil platform in the North Sea
 Ninian Park, football stadium in Cardiff
 St Ninian's Isle, Shetland

Other
 Ninian, a character in Nintendo's Fire Emblem: The Blazing Blade